WTP may refer to:

Arts and entertainment
 "WTP", a song from the album K.T.S.E. by American artist Teyana Taylor
 "W.T.P." ("White Trash Party"), a song by rapper Eminem; See the album Recovery
 Winnie-the-Pooh, a creation of A. A. Milne

Philosophy
 Will to power, a prominent concept in the philosophy of Friedrich Nietzsche.

Science and technology
 Water treatment plant, a facility that performs water purification
 Web Tools Platform, a platform for the Eclipse software
 Western Treatment Plant, a sewage treatment plant in Australia
 Wireless transaction protocol, technical term in wireless communication

Other uses
 Besix Watpac, an Australian construction company ASX ticker code
 Willingness to pay, economic term
 Women's Torah Project, transcription of the Torah entirely by women